Bushi Moletsane (born 2 January 1984) is a Mosotho footballer who currently plays as a midfielder for Lioli Teyateyaneng. Since 2003, he has won 53 caps and scored three goals for the Lesotho national football team.

External links

Association football midfielders
Lesotho footballers
Lesotho international footballers
1984 births
Living people